This is a list of the bird species recorded in Somaliland. The avifauna of Somaliland include a total of 725 species, of which seven are endemic, one has been introduced by humans and one is rare or accidental. Fourteen species are globally threatened.

This list's taxonomic treatment (designation and sequence of orders, families and species) and nomenclature (common and scientific names) follow the conventions of The Clements Checklist of Birds of the World, 6th edition. The family accounts at the beginning of each heading reflect this taxonomy, as do the species counts found in each family account. Introduced and accidental species are included in the total counts for Somaliland.

The following tags have been used to highlight several categories, but not all species fall into one of these categories. Those that do not are commonly occurring native species.

(A) Accidental - a species that rarely or accidentally occurs in Somaliland
(E) Endemic - a species endemic to Somaliland
(I) Introduced - a species introduced to Somaliland as a consequence, direct or indirect, of human actions

Ostriches
Order: StruthioniformesFamily: Struthionidae

The ostrich is a flightless bird native to Africa. It is the largest living species of bird. It is distinctive in its appearance, with a long neck and legs and the ability to run at high speeds.

Somali ostrich, Struthio molybdophanes

Grebes
Order: PodicipediformesFamily: Podicipedidae

Grebes are small to medium-large freshwater diving birds. They have lobed toes and are excellent swimmers and divers. However, they have their feet placed far back on the body, making them quite ungainly on land. There are 20 species worldwide and 2 species which occur in Somaliland.

Little grebe, Tachybaptus ruficollis
Eared grebe, Podiceps nigricollis

Albatrosses
Order: ProcellariiformesFamily: Diomedeidae

The albatrosses are among the largest of flying birds, and the great albatrosses from the genus Diomedea have the largest wingspans of any extant birds. There are 21 species worldwide and 1 species which occurs in Somaliland.

Shy albatross, Thalassarche cauta (A)

Shearwaters and petrels
Order: ProcellariiformesFamily: Procellariidae

The procellariids are the main group of medium-sized "true petrels", characterised by united nostrils with medium septum and a long outer functional primary.

Cape petrel, Daption capense
Mascarene petrel, Pterodroma aterrima
Antarctic prion, Pachyptila desolata
Jouanin's petrel, Bulweria fallax
Kerguelen petrel, Aphrodroma brevirostris
Flesh-footed shearwater, Ardenna carneipes
Wedge-tailed shearwater, Ardenna pacificus
Persian shearwater, Puffinus persicus
Tropical shearwater, Puffinus bailloni

Austral storm petrels
Order: ProcellariiformesFamily: Oceanitidae

The austral storm petrels are relatives of the petrels and are the smallest seabirds. They feed on planktonic crustaceans and small fish picked from the surface, typically while hovering. The flight is fluttering and sometimes bat-like.

Wilson's storm petrel, Oceanites oceanicus
White-faced storm petrel, Pelagodroma marina
Black-bellied storm petrel, Fregetta tropica

Northern storm petrels
Order: ProcellariiformesFamily: Hydrobatidae

Swinhoe's storm petrel, Oceanodroma monorhis
Matsudaira's storm petrel, Oceanodroma matsudairae

Tropicbirds
Order: PhaethontiformesFamily: Phaethontidae

Tropicbirds are slender white birds of tropical oceans, with exceptionally long central tail feathers. Their heads and long wings have black markings.

Red-billed tropicbird, Phaethon aethereus

Boobies and gannets
Order: SuliformesFamily: Sulidae

The sulids comprise the gannets and boobies. Both groups are medium to large coastal seabirds that plunge-dive for fish.

Masked booby, Sula dactylatra
Red-footed booby, Sula sula
Brown booby, Sula leucogaster

Cormorants
Order: SuliformesFamily: Phalacrocoracidae

Phalacrocoracidae is a family of medium to large coastal, fish-eating seabirds that includes cormorants and shags. Plumage colouration varies, with the majority having mainly dark plumage, some species being black-and-white and a few being colourful.

Great cormorant, Phalacrocorax carbo
Socotra cormorant, Phalacrocorax nigrogularis
Long-tailed cormorant, Microcarbo africanus

Darters
Order: SuliformesFamily: Anhingidae

Darters are often called "snake-birds" because of their long thin neck, which gives a snake-like appearance when they swim with their bodies submerged. The males have black and dark-brown plumage, an erectile crest on the nape and a larger bill than the female. The females have much paler plumage especially on the neck and underparts. The darters have completely webbed feet and their legs are short and set far back on the body. Their plumage is somewhat permeable, like that of cormorants, and they spread their wings to dry after diving.

African darter, Anhinga melanogaster

Frigatebirds
Order: SuliformesFamily: Fregatidae

Frigatebirds are large seabirds usually found over tropical oceans. They are large, black-and-white or completely black, with long wings and deeply forked tails. The males have coloured inflatable throat pouches. They do not swim or walk and cannot take off from a flat surface. Having the largest wingspan-to-body-weight ratio of any bird, they are essentially aerial, able to stay aloft for more than a week.

Great frigatebird, Fregata minor
Lesser frigatebird, Fregata ariel

Pelicans
Order: PelecaniformesFamily: Pelecanidae

Pelicans are large water birds with a distinctive pouch under their beak. As with other members of the order Pelecaniformes, they have webbed feet with four toes.

Great white pelican, Pelecanus onocrotalus
Pink-backed pelican, Pelecanus rufescens

Bitterns, herons and egrets
Order: PelecaniformesFamily: Ardeidae

The family Ardeidae contains the bitterns, herons and egrets. Herons and egrets are medium to large wading birds with long necks and legs. Bitterns tend to be shorter necked and more wary. Members of Ardeidae fly with their necks retracted, unlike other long-necked birds such as storks, ibises and spoonbills.

Grey heron, Ardea cinerea
Black-headed heron, Ardea melanocephala
Goliath heron, Ardea goliath
Purple heron, Ardea purpurea
Great egret, Ardea alba
Intermediate egret, Ardea intermedia
Black heron, Egretta ardesiaca
Western reef heron, Egretta gularis
Little egret, Egretta garzetta
Squacco heron, Ardeola ralloides
Madagascar pond heron, Ardeola idae
Cattle egret, Bubulcus ibis
Striated heron, Butorides striata
Black-crowned night heron, Nycticorax nycticorax
Dwarf bittern, Ixobrychus sturmii

Hammerkop
Order: PelecaniformesFamily: Scopidae

The hammerkop is a medium-sized bird with a long shaggy crest. The shape of its head with a curved bill and crest at the back is reminiscent of a hammer, hence its name. Its plumage is drab-brown all over.

Hamerkop, Scopus umbretta

Ibises and spoonbills
Order: PelecaniformesFamily: Threskiornithidae

Threskiornithidae is a family of large terrestrial and wading birds which includes the ibises and spoonbills. They have long, broad wings with 11 primary and about 20 secondary feathers. They are strong fliers and despite their size and weight, very capable soarers.

Sacred ibis, Threskiornis aethiopicus
Waldrapp, Geronticus eremita
Hadada ibis, Bostrychia hagedash
Glossy ibis, Plegadis falcinellus
Eurasian spoonbill, Platalea leucorodia
African spoonbill, Platalea alba

Storks
Order: CiconiiformesFamily: Ciconiidae

Storks are large, long-legged, long-necked, wading birds with long, stout bills. Storks are mute, but bill-clattering is an important mode of communication at the nest. Their nests can be large and may be reused for many years. Many species are migratory.

Yellow-billed stork, Mycteria ibis
African openbill, Anastomus lamelligerus
Black stork, Ciconia nigra
Abdim's stork, Ciconia abdimii
African woolly-necked stork, Ciconia microscelis
White stork, Ciconia ciconia
Saddle-billed stork, Ephippiorhynchus senegalensis
Marabou stork, Leptoptilos crumenifer

Flamingos
Order: PhoenicopteriformesFamily: Phoenicopteridae

Flamingos filter-feed on shellfish and algae. Their oddly shaped beaks are specially adapted to separate mud and silt from the food they consume and, uniquely, are used upside-down. There are 6 species worldwide and 2 species which occur in Somaliland.

Greater flamingo, Phoenicopterus roseus
Lesser flamingo, Phoenicopterus minor

Ducks, geese and swans
Order: AnseriformesFamily: Anatidae

Anatidae includes the ducks and most duck-like waterfowl, such as geese and swans. These birds are adapted to an aquatic existence with webbed feet, flattened bills, and feathers that are excellent at shedding water due to an oily coating.

Fulvous whistling duck, Dendrocygna bicolor
White-faced whistling duck, Dendrocygna viduata
White-backed duck, Thalassornis leuconotus
Egyptian goose, Alopochen aegyptiacus
Ruddy shelduck, Tadorna ferruginea
Knob-billed duck, Sarkidiornis melanotos
African pygmy goose, Nettapus auritus
Eurasian wigeon, Mareca penelope
Gadwall, Mareca strepera
Green-winged teal, Anas crecca
Yellow-billed duck, Anas undulata
Northern pintail, Anas acuta
Red-billed duck, Anas erythrorhyncha
Hottentot teal, Spatula hottentota
Garganey, Spatula querquedula
Northern shoveler, Spatula clypeata
Southern pochard, Netta erythrophthalma
Tufted duck, Aythya fuligula

Osprey
Order: AccipitriformesFamily: Pandionidae

The family Pandionidae contains only one species, the osprey. The osprey is a medium-large raptor which is a specialist fish-eater with a worldwide distribution.

Osprey, Pandion haliaetus

Hawks, kites and eagles
Order: AccipitriformesFamily: Accipitridae

Accipitridae is a family of birds of prey, which includes hawks, eagles, kites, harriers and Old World vultures. These birds have powerful hooked beaks for tearing flesh from their prey, strong legs, powerful talons and keen eyesight.

African cuckoo hawk, Aviceda cuculoides
European honey buzzard, Pernis apivorus
Bat hawk, Macheiramphus alcinus
Black-winged kite, Elanus caeruleus
Scissor-tailed kite, Chelictinia riocourii
Yellow-billed kite, Milvus aegyptius
African fish eagle, Haliaeetus vocifer
Hooded vulture, Necrosyrtes monachus
Lammergeier, Gypaetus barbatus
Egyptian vulture, Neophron percnopterus
White-backed vulture, Gyps africanus
Rüppell's vulture, Gyps rueppelli
Eurasian griffon, Gyps fulvus
Lappet-faced vulture, Torgos tracheliotos
White-headed vulture, Trigonoceps occipitalis
Black-breasted snake eagle, Circaetus pectoralis
Brown snake eagle, Circaetus cinereus
Fasciated snake eagle, Circaetus fasciolatus
Bateleur, Terathopius ecaudatus
Western marsh harrier, Circus aeruginosus
African marsh harrier, Circus ranivorus
Pallid harrier, Circus macrourus
Montagu's harrier, Circus pygargus
African harrier-hawk, Polyboroides typus
Lizard buzzard, Kaupifalco monogrammicus
Dark chanting goshawk, Melierax metabates
Eastern chanting goshawk, Melierax poliopterus
Gabar goshawk, Micronisus gabar
African goshawk, Accipiter tachiro
Shikra, Accipiter badius
Little sparrowhawk, Accipiter minullus
Eurasian sparrowhawk, Accipiter nisus
Black goshawk, Accipiter melanoleucus
Grasshopper buzzard, Butastur rufipennis
Eurasian buzzard, Buteo buteo
Long-legged buzzard, Buteo rufinus
Augur buzzard, Buteo augur
Tawny eagle, Aquila rapax
Steppe eagle, Aquila nipalensis
Verreaux's eagle, Aquila verreauxii
African hawk-eagle, Aquila spilogaster
Wahlberg's eagle, Hieraaetus wahlbergi
Booted eagle, Hieraaetus pennatus
Ayres's hawk-eagle, Hieraaetus ayresii
Martial eagle, Polemaetus bellicosus
Long-crested eagle, Lophaetus occipitalis

Secretarybird
Order: AccipitriformesFamily: Sagittariidae

The secretarybird is a bird of prey in the order Falconiformes but is easily distinguished from other raptors by its long crane-like legs.

Secretarybird, Sagittarius serpentarius

Caracaras and falcons
Order: FalconiformesFamily: Falconidae

Falconidae is a family of diurnal birds of prey. They differ from hawks, eagles and kites in that they kill with their beaks instead of their talons. There are 62 species worldwide and 14 species which occur in Somaliland.

Pygmy falcon, Polihierax semitorquatus
Lesser kestrel, Falco naumanni
Eurasian kestrel, Falco tinnunculus
Greater kestrel, Falco rupicoloides
Red-necked falcon, Falco chicquera
Red-footed falcon, Falco vespertinus
Amur falcon, Falco amurensis
Eleonora's falcon, Falco eleonorae
Sooty falcon, Falco concolor
Eurasian hobby, Falco subbuteo
African hobby, Falco cuvierii
Lanner falcon, Falco biarmicus
Barbary falcon, Falco pelegrinoides
Peregrine falcon, Falco peregrinus

Pheasants and partridges
Order: GalliformesFamily: Phasianidae

The Phasianidae are a family of terrestrial birds which consists of quails, partridges, snowcocks, francolins, spurfowls, tragopans, monals, pheasants, peafowls and jungle fowls. In general, they are plump (although they vary in size) and have broad, relatively short wings. There are 7 species which have been recorded in Somaliland.

Crested francolin, Dendroperdix sephaena
Moorland francolin, Scleroptila psilolaemus
Orange River francolin, Scleroptila gutturalis
Yellow-necked spurfowl, Pternistis leucoscepus
Red-necked spurfowl, Pternistis afer
Chestnut-naped francolin, Pternistis castaneicollis
Harlequin quail, Coturnix delegorguei

Guineafowl
Order: GalliformesFamily: Numididae

Guineafowl are a group of African, seed-eating, ground-nesting birds that resemble partridges, but with featherless heads and spangled grey plumage. There are 6 species worldwide and 3 species which occur in Somaliland.

Helmeted guineafowl, Numida meleagris
Crested guineafowl, Guttera pucherani
Vulturine guineafowl, Acryllium vulturinum

Flufftails
Order: GruiformesFamily: Sarothruridae
Buff-spotted flufftail, Sarothrura elegans

Rails, crakes, gallinules and coots
Order: GruiformesFamily: Rallidae

Rallidae is a large family of small to medium-sized birds which includes the rails, crakes, coots and gallinules. Typically they inhabit dense vegetation in damp environments near lakes, swamps or rivers. In general they are shy and secretive birds, making them difficult to observe. Most species have strong legs and long toes which are well adapted to soft uneven surfaces. They tend to have short, rounded wings and to be weak fliers. There are 10 species which occur in Somaliland.

Corn crake, Crex crex
Black crake, Amaurornis flavirostris
Little crake, Porzana parva
Baillon's crake, Porzana pusilla
Spotted crake, Porzana porzana
African swamphen, Porphyrio madagascariensis
Allen's gallinule, Porphyrio alleni
Common moorhen, Gallinula chloropus
Lesser moorhen, Gallinula angulata
Red-knobbed coot, Fulica cristata

Sungrebe and finfoots
Order: GruiformesFamily: Heliornithidae

Heliornithidae is a small family of tropical birds with webbed lobes on their feet similar to those of grebes and coots. There are 3 species worldwide and 1 species which occurs in Somaliland.

African finfoot, Podica senegalensis

Bustards
Order: OtidiformesFamily: Otididae

Bustards are large terrestrial birds mainly associated with dry open country and steppes in the Old World. They are omnivorous and nest on the ground. They walk steadily on strong legs and big toes, pecking for food as they go. They have long broad wings with "fingered" wingtips and striking patterns in flight. Many have interesting mating displays.

Arabian bustard, Ardeotis arabs
Kori bustard, Ardeotis kori
Heuglin's bustard, Neotis heuglinii
White-bellied bustard, Eupodotis senegalensis
Little brown bustard, Eupodotis humilis
Buff-crested bustard, Lophotis gindiana
Black-bellied bustard, Lissotis melanogaster
Hartlaub's bustard, Lissotis hartlaubii

Jacanas
Order: CharadriiformesFamily: Jacanidae

The jacanas are a group of tropical waders in the family Jacanidae. They are found throughout the tropics. They are identifiable by their huge feet and claws which enable them to walk on floating vegetation in the shallow lakes that are their preferred habitat. There 8 species worldwide and 1 species which occurs in Somaliland.

African jacana, Actophilornis africanus

Buttonquails
Order: CharadriiformesFamily: Turnicidae

The buttonquails are small, drab, running birds which resemble the true quails. The female is the brighter of the sexes and initiates courtship. The male incubates the eggs and tends the young.

Small buttonquail, Turnix sylvatica

Painted-snipe
Order: CharadriiformesFamily: Rostratulidae

Painted-snipe are short-legged, long-billed birds similar in shape to the true snipes, but more brightly coloured. There are 2 species worldwide and 1 species which occurs in Somaliland.

Greater painted-snipe, Rostratula benghalensis

Crab-plover
Order: CharadriiformesFamily: Dromadidae

The crab-plover is related to the waders. It resembles a plover but with very long grey legs and a strong heavy black bill similar to a tern. It has black-and-white plumage, a long neck, partially webbed feet and a bill designed for eating crabs.

Crab-plover, Dromas ardeola

Oystercatchers
Order: CharadriiformesFamily: Haematopodidae

The oystercatchers are large and noisy plover-like birds, with strong bills used for smashing or prising open molluscs. There are 11 species worldwide and 1 species which occurs in Somaliland.

Eurasian oystercatcher, Haematopus ostralegus

Avocets and stilts
Order: CharadriiformesFamily: Recurvirostridae

Recurvirostridae is a family of large wading birds, which includes the avocets and stilts. The avocets have long legs and long up-curved bills. The stilts have extremely long legs and long, thin, straight bills. There are 9 species worldwide and 2 species which occur in Somaliland.

Black-winged stilt, Himantopus himantopus
Pied avocet, Recurvirostra avosetta

Thick-knees
Order: CharadriiformesFamily: Burhinidae

The thick-knees are a group of largely tropical waders in the family Burhinidae. They are found worldwide within the tropical zone, with some species also breeding in temperate Europe and Australia. They are medium to large waders with strong black or yellow-black bills, large yellow eyes and cryptic plumage. Despite being classed as waders, most species have a preference for arid or semi-arid habitats. There are 9 species worldwide and 3 species which occur in Somaliland.

Water thick-knee, Burhinus vermiculatus
Eurasian thick-knee, Burhinus oedicnemus
Spotted thick-knee, Burhinus capensis

Pratincoles and coursers
Order: CharadriiformesFamily: Glareolidae

Glareolidae is a family of wading birds comprising the pratincoles, which have short legs, long pointed wings and long forked tails, and the coursers, which have long legs, short wings and long, pointed bills which curve downwards. There are 8 species which occur in Somaliland.

Cream-colored courser, Cursorius cursor
Temminck's courser, Cursorius temminckii
Double-banded courser, Smutsornis africanus
Three-banded courser, Rhinoptilus cinctus
Bronze-winged courser, Rhinoptilus chalcopterus
Collared pratincole, Glareola pratincola
Black-winged pratincole, Glareola nordmanni
Madagascar pratincole, Glareola ocularis

Plovers and lapwings
Order: CharadriiformesFamily: Charadriidae

The family Charadriidae includes the plovers, dotterels and lapwings. They are small to medium-sized birds with compact bodies, short, thick necks and long, usually pointed, wings. They are found in open country worldwide, mostly in habitats near water. There are 66 species worldwide and 19 species which occur in Somaliland.

Spur-winged plover, Vanellus spinosus
Black-headed lapwing, Vanellus tectus
Senegal lapwing, Vanellus lugubris
Black-winged lapwing, Vanellus melanopterus
Crowned lapwing, Vanellus coronatus
Wattled lapwing, Vanellus senegallus
Sociable lapwing, Vanellus gregarius
Pacific golden-plover, Pluvialis fulva
European golden-plover, Pluvialis apricaria
Black-bellied plover, Pluvialis squatarola
Common ringed plover, Charadrius hiaticula
Little ringed plover, Charadrius dubius
Kittlitz's plover, Charadrius pecuarius
Three-banded plover, Charadrius tricollaris
White-fronted plover, Charadrius marginatus
Snowy plover, Charadrius alexandrinus
Lesser sandplover, Charadrius mongolus
Greater sandplover, Charadrius leschenaultii
Caspian plover, Charadrius asiaticus

Sandpipers and allies
Order: CharadriiformesFamily: Scolopacidae

Scolopacidae is a large diverse family of small to medium-sized shorebirds including the sandpipers, curlews, godwits, shanks, tattlers, woodcocks, snipes, dowitchers and phalaropes. The majority of these species eat small invertebrates picked out of the mud or soil. Variation in length of legs and bills enables multiple species to feed in the same habitat, particularly on the coast, without direct competition for food. There are 28 species which occur in Somaliland.

Jack snipe, Lymnocryptes minimus
Pintail snipe, Gallinago stenura
Great snipe, Gallinago media
Common snipe, Gallinago gallinago
Black-tailed godwit, Limosa limosa
Bar-tailed godwit, Limosa lapponica
Whimbrel, Numenius phaeopus
Slender-billed curlew, Numenius tenuirostris
Eurasian curlew, Numenius arquata
Spotted redshank, Tringa erythropus
Common redshank, Tringa totanus
Marsh sandpiper, Tringa stagnatilis
Common greenshank, Tringa nebularia
Green sandpiper, Tringa ochropus
Wood sandpiper, Tringa glareola
Terek sandpiper, Xenus cinereus
Common sandpiper, Actitis hypoleucos
Ruddy turnstone, Arenaria interpres
Red knot, Calidris canutus
Sanderling, Calidris alba
Red-necked stint, Calidris ruficollis
Little stint, Calidris minuta
Temminck's stint, Calidris temminckii
Curlew sandpiper, Calidris ferruginea
Dunlin, Calidris alpina
Broad-billed sandpiper, Calidris falcinellus
Ruff, Calidris pugnax
Red-necked phalarope, Phalaropus lobatus

Skuas and jaegers
Order: CharadriiformesFamily: Stercorariidae

The family Stercorariidae are, in general, medium to large birds, typically with grey or brown plumage, often with white markings on the wings. They nest on the ground in temperate and arctic regions and are long-distance migrants. There are 7 species worldwide and 4 species which occur in Somaliland.

South polar skua, Stercorarius maccormicki
Brown skua, Stercorarius antarctica
Pomarine jaeger, Stercorarius pomarinus
Parasitic jaeger, Stercorarius parasiticus

Gulls, terns, and skimmers
Order: CharadriiformesFamily: Laridae

Laridae is a family of medium to large seabirds, the gulls, terns, and skimmers. Gulls are typically grey or white, often with black markings on the head or wings. They have stout, longish bills and webbed feet. Terns are a group of generally medium to large seabirds typically with grey or white plumage, often with black markings on the head. Most terns hunt fish by diving but some pick insects off the surface of fresh water. Terns are generally long-lived birds, with several species known to live in excess of 30 years. Skimmers are a small family of tropical tern-like birds. They have an elongated lower mandible which they use to feed by flying low over the water surface and skimming the water for small fish.

White-eyed gull, Ichthyaetus leucophthalmus
Sooty gull, Ichthyaetus hemprichii
Pallas's gull, Ichthyaetus ichthyaetus
Grey-headed gull, Chroicocephalus cirrocephalus
Black-headed gull, Chroicocephalus ridibundus
Sabine's gull, Xema sabini
Herring gull, Larus argentatus
Lesser black-backed gull, Larus fuscus
Heuglin's gull, Larus heuglini
Caspian gull, Larus cachinnans
Armenian gull, Larus armenicus
Gull-billed tern, Gelochelidon nilotica
Caspian tern, Hydroprogne caspia
Lesser crested tern, Thalasseus bengalensis
Sandwich tern, Thalasseus sandvicensis
Great crested tern, Thalasseus bergii
Roseate tern, Sterna dougallii
Common tern, Sterna hirundo
Arctic tern, Sterna paradisaea
White-cheeked tern, Sterna repressa
Little tern, Sternula albifrons
Saunders's tern, Sternula saundersi
Bridled tern, Onychoprion anaethetus
Sooty tern, Onychoprion fuscatus
Whiskered tern, Chlidonias hybrida
White-winged tern, Chlidonias leucopterus
Black tern, Chlidonias niger
Lesser noddy, Anous tenuirostris
Brown noddy, Anous stolidus
African skimmer, Rynchops flavirostris

Sandgrouse
Order: PterocliformesFamily: Pteroclidae

Sandgrouse have small, pigeon like heads and necks, but sturdy compact bodies. They have long pointed wings and sometimes tails and a fast direct flight. Flocks fly to watering holes at dawn and dusk. Their legs are feathered down to the toes. There are 16 species worldwide and 4 species which occur in Somaliland.

Chestnut-bellied sandgrouse, Pterocles exustus
Spotted sandgrouse, Pterocles senegallus
Black-faced sandgrouse, Pterocles decoratus
Lichtenstein's sandgrouse, Pterocles lichtensteinii

Pigeons and doves
Order: ColumbiformesFamily: Columbidae

Pigeons and doves are stout-bodied birds with short necks and short slender bills with a fleshy cere.

Rock pigeon, Columba livia
Speckled pigeon, Columba guinea
White-collared pigeon, Columba albitorques
Somali pigeon, Columba oliviae (E)
Rameron pigeon, Columba arquatrix
Eurasian turtle dove, Streptopelia turtur
Dusky turtle dove, Streptopelia lugens
African collared dove, Streptopelia roseogrisea
White-winged collared dove, Streptopelia reichenowi
African mourning dove, Streptopelia decipiens
Red-eyed dove, Streptopelia semitorquata
Ring-necked dove, Streptopelia capicola
Laughing dove, Spilopelia senegalensis
Emerald-spotted wood dove, Turtur chalcospilos
Tambourine dove, Turtur tympanistria
Namaqua dove, Oena capensis
Bruce's green pigeon, Treron waalia

Old World parrots
Order: PsittaciformesFamily: Psittaculidae

Rose-ringed parakeet, Psittacula krameri

African and New World parrots
Order: PsittaciformesFamily: Psittacidae

Brown-headed parrot, Poicephalus cryptoxanthus
Red-bellied parrot, Poicephalus rufiventris

Turacos
Order: CuculiformesFamily: Musophagidae

The turacos, plantain eaters and go-away-birds make up the bird family Musophagidae. They are medium-sized arboreal birds. The turacos and plantain eaters are brightly coloured, usually in blue, green or purple. The go-away birds are mostly grey and white. There are 23 species worldwide and 3 species which occur in Somaliland.

Fischer's turaco, Tauraco fischeri
White-cheeked turaco, Tauraco leucotis
White-bellied go-away-bird, Corythaixoides leucogaster

Cuckoos and anis
Order: CuculiformesFamily: Cuculidae

The family Cuculidae includes cuckoos, roadrunners and anis. These birds are of variable size with slender bodies, long tails and strong legs. The Old World cuckoos are brood parasites. There are 138 species worldwide and 14 species which occur in Somaliland.

Pied cuckoo, Clamator jacobinus
Levaillant's cuckoo, Clamator levaillantii
Great spotted cuckoo, Clamator glandarius
Red-chested cuckoo, Cuculus solitarius
Black cuckoo, Cuculus clamosus
Common cuckoo, Cuculus canorus
African cuckoo, Cuculus gularis
Lesser cuckoo, Cuculus poliocephalus
Klaas's cuckoo, Chrysococcyx klaas
African emerald cuckoo, Chrysococcyx cupreus
Dideric cuckoo, Chrysococcyx caprius
Green malkoha, Ceuthmochares australis
Senegal coucal, Centropus senegalensis
White-browed coucal, Centropus superciliosus

Barn owls
Order: StrigiformesFamily: Tytonidae

Barn owls are medium to large owls with large heads and characteristic heart-shaped faces. They have long strong legs with powerful talons. There are 16 species worldwide and 1 species which occurs in Somaliland.

Barn owl, Tyto alba

Typical owls
Order: StrigiformesFamily: Strigidae

The typical owls are small to large solitary nocturnal birds of prey. They have large forward-facing eyes and ears, a hawk-like beak and a conspicuous circle of feathers around each eye called a facial disk. 

African scops-owl, Otus senegalensis
Eurasian scops-owl, Otus scops
Northern white-faced owl, Ptilopsis leucotis
Southern white-faced owl, Ptilopsis granti
Spotted eagle-owl, Bubo africanus
Greyish eagle-owl, Bubo cinerascens
Verreaux's eagle-owl, Bubo lacteus
Pel's fishing-owl, Scotopelia peli
African wood-owl, Strix woodfordii
Pearl-spotted owlet, Glaucidium perlatum
African barred owlet, Glaucidium capense
Little owl, Athene noctua
Short-eared owl, Asio flammeus

Nightjars
Order: CaprimulgiformesFamily: Caprimulgidae

Nightjars are medium-sized nocturnal birds that usually nest on the ground. They have long wings, short legs and very short bills. Most have small feet, of little use for walking, and long pointed wings. Their soft plumage is camouflaged to resemble bark or leaves. There are 13 species which have been recorded in Somaliland.

Eurasian nightjar, Caprimulgus europaeus
Sombre nightjar, Caprimulgus fraenatus
Egyptian nightjar, Caprimulgus aegyptius
Nubian nightjar, Caprimulgus nubicus
Donaldson-Smith's nightjar, Caprimulgus donaldsoni
Fiery-necked nightjar, Caprimulgus pectoralis
Plain nightjar, Caprimulgus inornatus
Star-spotted nightjar, Caprimulgus stellatus
Long-tailed nightjar, Caprimulgus climacurus
Slender-tailed nightjar, Caprimulgus clarus
Square-tailed nightjar, Caprimulgus fossii
Pennant-winged nightjar, Caprimulgus vexillarius
Standard-winged nightjar, Caprimulgus longipennis

Swifts
Order: CaprimulgiformesFamily: Apodidae

Swifts are small birds which spend the majority of their lives flying. These birds have very short legs and never settle voluntarily on the ground, perching instead only on vertical surfaces. Many swifts have long swept-back wings which resemble a crescent or boomerang. 

Mottled spinetail, Telacanthura ussheri
Bat-like spinetail, Neafrapus boehmi
African palm-swift, Cypsiurus parvus
Alpine swift, Tachymarptis melba
Common swift, Apus apus
Nyanza swift, Apus niansae
Pallid swift, Apus pallidus
Forbes-Watson's swift, Apus berliozi
Little swift, Apus affinis
White-rumped swift, Apus caffer

Mousebirds
Order: ColiiformesFamily: Coliidae

The mousebirds are slender greyish or brown birds with soft, hairlike body feathers and very long thin tails. They are arboreal and scurry through the leaves like rodents in search of berries, fruit and buds. They are acrobatic and can feed upside down. All species have strong claws and reversible outer toes. They also have crests and stubby bills. There are 6 species worldwide and 3 species which occur in Somaliland.

Speckled mousebird, Colius striatus
White-headed mousebird, Colius leucocephalus
Blue-naped mousebird, Urocolius macrourus

Trogons and quetzals
Order: TrogoniformesFamily: Trogonidae

The family Trogonidae includes trogons and quetzals. Found in tropical woodlands worldwide, they feed on insects and fruit, and their broad bills and weak legs reflect their diet and arboreal habits. Although their flight is fast, they are reluctant to fly any distance. Trogons have soft, often colourful, feathers with distinctive male and female plumage. There are 33 species worldwide and 1 species which occurs in Somaliland.

Narina trogon, Apaloderma narina

Kingfishers
Order: CoraciiformesFamily: Alcedinidae

Kingfishers are medium-sized birds with large heads, long, pointed bills, short legs and stubby tails. There are 93 species worldwide and 10 species which occur in Somaliland.

Malachite kingfisher, Corythornis cristatus
African pygmy kingfisher, Ispidina picta
Grey-headed kingfisher, Halcyon leucocephala
Woodland kingfisher, Halcyon senegalensis
Mangrove kingfisher, Halcyon senegaloides
Brown-hooded kingfisher, Halcyon albiventris
Striped kingfisher, Halcyon chelicuti
Collared kingfisher, Todirhamphus chloris
Giant kingfisher, Megaceryle maximus
Pied kingfisher, Ceryle rudis

Bee-eaters
Order: CoraciiformesFamily: Meropidae

The bee-eaters are a group of near passerine birds in the family Meropidae. Most species are found in Africa but others occur in southern Europe, Madagascar, Australia and New Guinea. They are characterised by richly coloured plumage, slender bodies and usually elongated central tail feathers. All are colourful and have long downturned bills and pointed wings, which give them a swallow-like appearance when seen from afar. There are 26 species worldwide and 8 species which occur in Somaliland.

Little bee-eater, Merops pusillus
Cinnamon-chested bee-eater, Merops oreobates
Somali bee-eater, Merops revoilii
White-throated bee-eater, Merops albicollis
Blue-cheeked bee-eater, Merops persicus
Madagascar bee-eater, Merops superciliosus
European bee-eater, Merops apiaster
Northern carmine bee-eater, Merops nubicus

Typical rollers
Order: CoraciiformesFamily: Coraciidae

Rollers resemble crows in size and build, but are more closely related to the kingfishers and bee-eaters. They share the colourful appearance of those groups with blues and browns predominating. The two inner front toes are connected, but the outer toe is not. There are 12 species worldwide and 5 species which occur in Somaliland.

European roller, Coracias garrulus
Abyssinian roller, Coracias abyssinica
Lilac-breasted roller, Coracias caudata
Rufous-crowned roller, Coracias naevia
Broad-billed roller, Eurystomus glaucurus

Hoopoes
Order: BucerotiformesFamily: Upupidae

Hoopoes have black, white and orangey-pink colouring with a large erectile crest on their head. There are 2 species worldwide and 1 species which occurs in Somaliland.

Hoopoe, Upupa epops

Woodhoopoes
Order: BucerotiformesFamily: Phoeniculidae

The woodhoopoes are related to the kingfishers, rollers and hoopoes. They most resemble the hoopoes with their long curved bills, used to probe for insects, and short rounded wings. However, they differ in that they have metallic plumage, often blue, green or purple, and lack an erectile crest. There are 8 species worldwide and 5 species which occur in Somaliland.

Green woodhoopoe, Phoeniculus purpureus
Black-billed woodhoopoe, Phoeniculus somaliensis
Black scimitar-bill, Rhinopomastus aterrimus
Common scimitar-bill, Rhinopomastus cyanomelas
Abyssinian scimitar-bill, Rhinopomastus minor

Hornbills
Order: BucerotiformesFamily: Bucerotidae

Hornbills are a group of birds whose bill is shaped like a cow's horn, but without a twist, sometimes with a casque on the upper mandible. Frequently, the bill is brightly coloured.

Northern red-billed hornbill, Tockus erythrorhynchus
Eastern yellow-billed hornbill, Tockus flavirostris
Von der Decken's hornbill, Tockus deckeni
Crowned hornbill, Lophoceros alboterminatus
Hemprich's hornbill, Lophoceros hemprichii
African grey hornbill, Lophoceros nasutus
Silvery-cheeked hornbill, Bycanistes brevis

Ground-hornbills
Order: BucerotiformesFamily: Bucorvidae

The ground-hornbills are terrestrial birds which feed almost entirely on insects, other birds, snakes, and amphibians.

Abyssinian ground-hornbill, Bucorvus abyssinicus

African barbets
Order: PiciformesFamily: Lybiidae

The African barbets are plump birds, with short necks and large heads. They get their name from the bristles which fringe their heavy bills. Most species are brightly coloured.

Red-fronted tinkerbird, Pogoniulus pusillus
Red-fronted barbet, Tricholaema diademata
Black-throated barbet, Tricholaema melanocephala
Brown-breasted barbet, Lybius melanopterus
Yellow-breasted barbet, Trachyphonus margaritatus
Red-and-yellow barbet, Trachyphonus erythrocephalus
D'Arnaud's barbet, Trachyphonus darnaudii

Honeyguides
Order: PiciformesFamily: Indicatoridae

Honeyguides are among the few birds that feed on wax. They are named for the greater honeyguide which leads traditional honey-hunters to bees' nests and, after the hunters have harvested the honey, feeds on the remaining contents of the hive. There are 17 species worldwide and 4 species which occur in Somaliland.

Scaly-throated honeyguide, Indicator variegatus
Greater honeyguide, Indicator indicator
Lesser honeyguide, Indicator minor
Wahlberg's honeyguide, Prodotiscus regulus

Woodpeckers and allies
Order: PiciformesFamily: Picidae

Woodpeckers are small to medium-sized birds with chisel-like beaks, short legs, stiff tails and long tongues used for capturing insects. Some species have feet with two toes pointing forward and two backward, while several species have only three toes. Many woodpeckers have the habit of tapping noisily on tree trunks with their beaks.

Eurasian wryneck, Jynx torquilla
Nubian woodpecker, Campethera nubica
Golden-tailed woodpecker, Campethera abingoni
Mombasa woodpecker, Campethera mombassica
Green-backed woodpecker, Campethera cailliautii
Cardinal woodpecker, Dendropicos fuscescens
Bearded woodpecker, Chloropicus namaquus

Larks
Order: PasseriformesFamily: Alaudidae

Larks are small terrestrial birds with often extravagant songs and display flights. Most larks are fairly dull in appearance. Their food is insects and seeds.

Horsfield’s bushlark, Mirafra javanica
White-tailed lark, Mirafra albicauda
Red-winged lark, Mirafra hypermetra
Somali long-billed lark, Mirafra somalica
Ash's lark, Mirafra ashi (E)
Rufous-naped lark, Mirafra africana
Flappet lark, Mirafra rufocinnamomea
Collared lark, Mirafra collaris
Gillett's lark, Mirafra gilletti
Pink-breasted lark, Calendulauda poecilosterna
Fawn-coloured lark, Calendulauda africanoides
Archer's lark, Heteromirafra archeri
Sidamo lark, Heteromirafra sidamoensis
Chestnut-backed sparrow-lark, Eremopterix leucotis
Black-crowned sparrow-lark, Eremopterix nigriceps
Chestnut-headed sparrow-lark, Eremopterix signata
Desert lark, Ammomanes deserti
Greater hoopoe-lark, Alaemon alaudipes
Lesser hoopoe-lark, Alaemon hamertoni (E)
Greater short-toed lark, Calandrella brachydactyla
Rufous-capped lark, Calandrella eremica
Red-capped lark, Calandrella cinerea
Somali short-toed lark, Alaudala somalica
Obbia lark, Spizocorys obbiensis (E)
Short-tailed lark, Spizocorys fremantlii
Crested lark, Galerida cristata
Thekla lark, Galerida theklae

Swallows and martins
Order: PasseriformesFamily: Hirundinidae

The family Hirundinidae is adapted to aerial feeding. They have a slender streamlined body, long pointed wings and a short bill with a wide gape. The feet are adapted to perching rather than walking, and the front toes are partially joined at the base. There are 75 species worldwide and 12 species which occur in Somaliland.

Sand martin, Riparia riparia
Brown-throated martin, Riparia paludicola
Banded martin, Riparia cincta
Pale crag martin, Ptyonoprogne obsoleta
Barn swallow, Hirundo rustica
Red-chested swallow, Hirundo lucida
Ethiopian swallow, Hirundo aethiopica
Wire-tailed swallow, Hirundo smithii
Lesser striped swallow, Cecropis abyssinica
Mosque swallow, Cecropis senegalensis
Red-rumped swallow, Cecropis daurica
Common house martin, Delichon urbicum

Wagtails and pipits
Order: PasseriformesFamily: Motacillidae

Motacillidae is a family of small passerine birds with medium to long tails. They include the wagtails, longclaws and pipits. They are slender, ground feeding insectivores of open country. There are 54 species worldwide and 14 species which occur in Somaliland.

White wagtail, Motacilla alba
African pied wagtail, Motacilla aguimp
Yellow wagtail, Motacilla flava
Grey wagtail, Motacilla cinerea
Golden pipit, Tmetothylacus tenellus
Yellow-throated longclaw, Macronyx croceus
Pangani longclaw, Macronyx aurantiigula
Plain-backed pipit, Anthus leucophrys
African pipit, Anthus cinnamomeus
Malindi pipit, Anthus melindae
Tawny pipit, Anthus campestris
Long-billed pipit, Anthus similis
Tree pipit, Anthus trivialis
Red-throated pipit, Anthus cervinus

Cuckooshrikes
Order: PasseriformesFamily: Campephagidae

The cuckooshrikes are small to medium-sized passerine birds. They are predominantly greyish with white and black, although some species are brightly coloured. There are 82 species worldwide and 3 species which occur in Somaliland.

Grey cuckooshrike, Coracina caesia
Black cuckooshrike, Campephaga flava
Red-shouldered cuckooshrike, Campephaga phoenicea

Bulbuls
Order: PasseriformesFamily: Pycnonotidae

Bulbuls are medium-sized songbirds. Some are colourful with yellow, red or orange vents, cheeks, throats or supercilia, but most are drab, with uniform olive-brown to black plumage. Some species have distinct crests. There are 130 species worldwide and 7 species which occur in Somaliland.

Common bulbul, Pycnonotus barbatus
Sombre greenbul, Andropadus importunus
Yellow-bellied greenbul, Chlorocichla flaviventris
Fischer's greenbul, Phyllastrephus fischeri
Terrestrial brownbul, Phyllastrephus terrestris
Northern brownbul, Phyllastrephus strepitans
Eastern nicator, Nicator gularis

Thrushes and allies
Order: PasseriformesFamily: Turdidae

The thrushes are a group of passerine birds that occur mainly in the Old World. They are plump, soft plumaged, small to medium-sized insectivores or sometimes omnivores, often feeding on the ground. Many have attractive songs.

Red-tailed ant thrush, Neocossyphus rufus
African bare-eyed thrush, Turdus tephronotus

Cisticolas and allies
Order: PasseriformesFamily: Cisticolidae

The Cisticolidae are warblers found mainly in warmer southern regions of the Old World. They are generally very small birds of drab brown or grey appearance found in open country such as grassland or scrub.

Boran cisticola, Cisticola bodessa
Rattling cisticola, Cisticola chiniana
Ashy cisticola, Cisticola cinereolus
Coastal cisticola, Cisticola haematocephalus
Croaking cisticola, Cisticola natalensis
Siffling cisticola, Cisticola brachypterus
Tiny cisticola, Cisticola nana
Zitting cisticola, Cisticola juncidis
Desert cisticola, Cisticola aridulus
Pectoral-patch cisticola, Cisticola brunnescens
Graceful prinia, Prinia gracilis
Tawny-flanked prinia, Prinia subflava
Pale prinia, Prinia somalica
Red-fronted prinia, Prinia rufifrons
Yellow-breasted apalis, Apalis flavida
Black-headed apalis, Apalis melanocephala
Green-backed camaroptera, Camaroptera brachyura
Grey wren-warbler, Calamonastes simplex
Yellow-vented eremomela, Eremomela flavicrissalis
Yellow-bellied eremomela, Eremomela icteropygialis

African warblers
Order: PasseriformesFamily: Macrosphenidae
Northern crombec, Sylvietta brachyura
Short-billed crombec, Sylvietta philippae
Red-faced crombec, Sylvietta whytii
Somali crombec, Sylvietta isabellina

Locustellid warblers
Order: PasseriformesFamily: Locustellidae
Eurasian river warbler, Locustella fluviatilis

Acrocephalid warblers
Order: PasseriformesFamily: Acrocephalidae
Sedge warbler, Acrocephalus schoenobaenus
Common reed warbler, Acrocephalus scirpaceus
Marsh warbler, Acrocephalus palustris
Great reed warbler, Acrocephalus arundinaceus
Clamorous reed warbler, Acrocephalus stentoreus
Basra reed warbler, Acrocephalus griseldis
Lesser swamp warbler, Acrocephalus gracilirostris
Booted warbler, Iduna caligata
Eastern olivaceous warbler, Iduna pallida
Upcher's warbler, Hippolais languida
Olive-tree warbler, Hippolais olivetorum
Icterine warbler, Hippolais icterina

Phylloscopid warblers
Order: PasseriformesFamily: Phylloscopidae
Brown woodland warbler, Phylloscopus umbrovirens
Willow warbler, Phylloscopus trochilus
Common chiffchaff, Phylloscopus collybita
Wood warbler, Phylloscopus sibilatrix

Sylviid warblers, parrotbills, and allies 
Order: PasseriformesFamily: Sylviidae

The family Sylviidae is a group of small insectivorous passerine birds. They mainly occur as breeding species, as the common name implies, in Europe, Asia and, to a lesser extent, Africa. Most are of generally undistinguished appearance, but many have distinctive songs.
Eurasian blackcap, Sylvia atricapilla
Garden warbler, Sylvia borin
Greater whitethroat, Sylvia communis
Lesser whitethroat, Sylvia curruca
African desert warbler, Sylvia deserti
Barred warbler, Sylvia nisoria
Western Orphean warbler, Sylvia hortensis
Red Sea warbler, Sylvia leucomelaena
Eastern subalpine warbler, Sylvia cantillans
Menetries's warbler, Sylvia mystacea
Banded parisoma, Sylvia boehmi

Old World flycatchers
Order: PasseriformesFamily: Muscicapidae

Old World flycatchers are a large group of small passerine birds native to the Old World. They are mainly small arboreal insectivores. The appearance of these birds is highly varied, but they mostly have weak songs and harsh calls.

Rufous-tailed rock thrush, Monticola saxatilis
Little rock thrush, Monticola rufocinereus
Blue rock thrush, Monticola solitarius
Pale flycatcher, Melaenornis pallidus
African grey flycatcher, Melaenornis microrhynchus
Northern black flycatcher, Melaenornis edolioides
Southern black flycatcher, Melaenornis pammelaina
Spotted flycatcher, Muscicapa striata
Gambaga flycatcher, Muscicapa gambagae
Ashy flycatcher, Muscicapa caerulescens
Semicollared flycatcher, Ficedula semitorquata
Thrush nightingale, Luscinia luscinia
Common nightingale, Luscinia megarhynchos
Bluethroat, Luscinia svecica
White-throated robin, Irania gutturalis
White-browed robin-chat, Cossypha heuglini
Red-capped robin-chat, Cossypha natalensis
Spotted morning-thrush, Cichladusa guttata
Bearded scrub robin, Cercotrichas quadrivirgata
Red-backed scrub-robin, Cercotrichas leucophrys
Rufous-tailed scrub robin, Cercotrichas galactotes
Black scrub robin, Cercotrichas podobe
Black redstart, Phoenicurus ochruros
Common redstart, Phoenicurus phoenicurus
Whinchat, Saxicola rubetra
African stonechat, Saxicola torquatus
White-tailed wheatear, Oenanthe leucopyga
Hooded wheatear, Oenanthe monacha
Somali wheatear, Oenanthe phillipsi
Northern wheatear, Oenanthe oenanthe
Mourning wheatear, Oenanthe lugens
Pied wheatear, Oenanthe pleschanka
Black-eared wheatear, Oenanthe hispanica
Kurdish wheatear, Oenanthe xanthoprymna
Desert wheatear, Oenanthe deserti
Capped wheatear, Oenanthe pileata
Isabelline wheatear, Oenanthe isabellina
Heuglin's wheatear, Oenanthe heuglini
Brown-tailed chat, Cercomela scotocerca
Sombre chat, Cercomela dubia
Blackstart, Cercomela melanura
White-winged cliff-chat, Thamnolaea semirufa

Wattle-eyes
Order: PasseriformesFamily: Platysteiridae

The wattle-eyes, or puffback flycatchers, are small stout passerine birds of the African tropics. They get their name from the brightly coloured fleshy eye decorations found in most species in this group. 

Black-and-white shrike-flycatcher, Bias musicus
Black-throated wattle-eye, Platysteira peltata
Grey-headed batis, Batis orientalis
Eastern black-headed batis, Batis minor
Pygmy batis, Batis perkeo

Erythrocercid flycatchers
Order: PasseriformesFamily: Erythrocercidae

Yellow flycatcher, Erythrocercus holochlorus

Monarch flycatchers
Order: PasseriformesFamily: Monarchidae

The monarch flycatchers are small to medium-sized insectivorous passerines which hunt by flycatching.

Yellow flycatcher, Erythrocercus holochlorus
African crested-flycatcher, Trochocercus cyanomelas
African paradise-flycatcher, Terpsiphone viridis

Laughingthrushes
Order: PasseriformesFamily: Leiothrichidae

Scaly chatterer, Turdoides aylmeri
Rufous chatterer, Turdoides rubiginosus
Scaly babbler, Turdoides squamulatus
White-rumped babbler, Turdoides leucopygius

Chickadees and titmice
Order: PasseriformesFamily: Paridae

The Paridae are mainly small stocky woodland species with short stout bills. Some have crests. They are adaptable birds, with a mixed diet including seeds and insects. There are 59 species worldwide and 1 species which occurs in Somaliland.

Somali tit, Melaniparus thruppi

Penduline tits
Order: PasseriformesFamily: Remizidae

The penduline tits are a group of small passerine birds related to the true tits. They are insectivores. There are 13 species worldwide and 1 species which occurs in Somaliland.

Mouse-coloured penduline-tit, Anthoscopus musculus

Sunbirds and spiderhunters
Order: PasseriformesFamily: Nectariniidae

The sunbirds and spiderhunters are very small passerine birds which feed largely on nectar, although they will also take insects, especially when feeding young. Flight is fast and direct on their short wings. Most species can take nectar by hovering like a hummingbird, but usually perch to feed. 

Eastern violet-backed sunbird, Anthreptes orientalis
Collared sunbird, Hedydipna collaris
Pygmy sunbird, Hedydipna platura
Nile Valley sunbird, Hedydipna metallica
Eastern olive-sunbird, Cyanomitra olivacea
Mouse-coloured sunbird, Cyanomitra veroxii
Amethyst sunbird, Chalcomitra amethystina
Scarlet-chested sunbird, Chalcomitra senegalensis
Hunter's sunbird, Chalcomitra hunteri
Beautiful sunbird, Cinnyris pulchellus
Mariqua sunbird, Cinnyris mariquensis
Black-bellied sunbird, Cinnyris nectarinioides
Purple-banded sunbird, Cinnyris bifasciatus
Tsavo sunbird, Cinnyris tsavoensis
Violet-breasted sunbird, Cinnyris chalcomelas
Shining sunbird, Cinnyris habessinicus
Variable sunbird, Cinnyris venustus

White-eyes
Order: PasseriformesFamily: Zosteropidae

The white-eyes are small and mostly undistinguished, their plumage above being generally some dull colour like greenish-olive, but some species have a white or bright yellow throat, breast or lower parts, and several have buff flanks. As their name suggests, many species have a white ring around each eye. 

Abyssinian white-eye, Zosterops abyssinicus
Pale white-eye, Zosterops flavilateralis

Old World orioles
Order: PasseriformesFamily: Oriolidae

The Old World orioles are colourful passerine birds. They are not related to the New World orioles. There are 29 species worldwide and 3 species which occur in Somaliland.

Eurasian golden oriole, Oriolus oriolus
African golden oriole, Oriolus auratus
African black-headed oriole, Oriolus larvatus

Shrikes
Order: PasseriformesFamily: Laniidae

Shrikes are passerine birds known for their habit of catching other birds and small animals and impaling the uneaten portions of their bodies on thorns. A typical shrike's beak is hooked, like a bird of prey.

Red-backed shrike, Lanius collurio
Isabelline shrike, Lanius isabellinus
Red-tailed shrike, Lanius phoenicuroides
Great grey shrike, Lanius excubitor
Lesser grey shrike, Lanius minor
Long-tailed fiscal, Lanius cabanisi
Taita fiscal, Lanius dorsalis
Somali fiscal, Lanius somalicus
Masked shrike, Lanius nubicus
Woodchat shrike, Lanius senator
White-rumped shrike, Eurocephalus ruppelli

Bushshrikes and allies
Order: PasseriformesFamily: Malaconotidae

Bushshrikes are similar in habits to shrikes, hunting insects and other small prey from a perch on a bush. Although similar in build to the shrikes, these tend to be either colourful species or largely black; some species are quite secretive.

Brubru, Nilaus afer
Northern puffback, Dryoscopus gambensis
Pringle's puffback, Dryoscopus pringlii
Black-backed puffback, Dryoscopus cubla
Black-crowned tchagra, Tchagra senegala
Three-streaked tchagra, Tchagra jamesi
Red-naped bushshrike, Laniarius ruficeps
Ethiopian boubou, Laniarius aethiopicus
Black boubou, Laniarius nigerrimus
East Coast boubou, Laniarius sublacteus
Slate-colored boubou, Laniarius funebris
Rosy-patched bushshrike, Rhodophoneus cruentus
Sulphur-breasted bushshrike, Telophorus sulfureopectus
Four-colored bushshrike, Telophorus viridis
Grey-headed bushshrike, Malaconotus blanchoti

Vangas, helmetshrikes, and allies 
Order: PasseriformesFamily: Vangidae

The helmetshrikes are similar in build to the shrikes, but tend to be colourful species with distinctive crests or other head ornaments, such as wattles, from which they get their name. 

White helmetshrike, Prionops plumatus
Retz's helmetshrike, Prionops retzii
Chestnut-fronted helmetshrike, Prionops scopifrons

Drongos
Order: PasseriformesFamily: Dicruridae

The drongos are mostly black or dark grey in colour, sometimes with metallic tints. They have long forked tails, and some Asian species have elaborate tail decorations. They have short legs and sit very upright when perched, like a shrike. They flycatch or take prey from the ground. There are 2 species which occur in Somaliland.

Common square-tailed drongo, Dicrurus ludwigii
Fork-tailed drongo, Dicrurus adsimilis

Crows, jays, ravens and magpies
Order: PasseriformesFamily: Corvidae

The family Corvidae includes crows, ravens, jays, choughs, magpies, treepies, nutcrackers and ground jays. Corvids are above average in size among the Passeriformes, and some of the larger species show high levels of intelligence. There are 120 species worldwide and 7 species which occur in Somaliland.

House crow, Corvus splendens
Cape crow, Corvus capensis
Pied crow, Corvus albus
Brown-necked raven, Corvus ruficollis
Somali crow, Corvus edithae
Fan-tailed raven, Corvus rhipidurus
Thick-billed raven, Corvus crassirostris

Starlings
Order: PasseriformesFamily: Sturnidae

Starlings are small to medium-sized passerine birds. Their flight is strong and direct and they are very gregarious. Their preferred habitat is fairly open country. They eat insects and fruit. Plumage is typically dark with a metallic sheen.

European starling, Sturnus vulgaris
Wattled starling, Creatophora cinerea
Greater blue-eared glossy-starling, Lamprotornis chalybaeus
Lesser blue-eared glossy-starling, Lamprotornis chloropterus
Rueppell's glossy-starling, Lamprotornis purpuropterus
Golden-breasted starling, Lamprotornis regius
Superb starling, Lamprotornis superbus
Shelley's starling, Lamprotornis shelleyi
Black-bellied starling, Notopholia corrusca
Violet-backed starling, Cinnyricinclus leucogaster
Fischer's starling, Lamprotornis fischeri
White-crowned starling, Lamprotornis albicapillus
Red-winged starling, Onychognathus morio
Somali starling, Onychognathus blythii
Bristle-crowned starling, Onychognathus salvadorii
Magpie starling, Speculipastor bicolor
Red-billed oxpecker, Buphagus erythrorhynchus

Weavers and allies
Order: PasseriformesFamily: Ploceidae

The weavers are small passerine birds related to the finches. They are seed-eating birds with rounded conical bills. The males of many species are brightly coloured, usually in red or yellow and black, some species show variation in colour only in the breeding season. There are 116 species worldwide and 27 species which occur in Somaliland.

Red-billed buffalo-weaver, Bubalornis niger
White-headed buffalo-weaver, Dinemellia dinemelli
Speckle-fronted weaver, Sporopipes frontalis
White-browed sparrow-weaver, Plocepasser mahali
Donaldson-Smith's sparrow-weaver, Plocepasser donaldsoni
Grey-headed social-weaver, Pseudonigrita arnaudi
Black-capped social-weaver, Pseudonigrita cabanisi
Lesser masked-weaver, Ploceus intermedius
Black-necked weaver, Ploceus nigricollis
African golden-weaver, Ploceus subaureus
Golden palm weaver, Ploceus bojeri
Rueppell's weaver, Ploceus galbula
Northern masked-weaver, Ploceus taeniopterus
Vitelline masked-weaver, Ploceus vitellinus
Village weaver, Ploceus cucullatus
Speke's weaver, Ploceus spekei
Salvadori's weaver, Ploceus dichrocephalus
Chestnut weaver, Ploceus rubiginosus
Forest weaver, Ploceus bicolor
Red-headed weaver, Anaplectes rubriceps
Red-headed quelea, Quelea erythrops
Red-billed quelea, Quelea quelea
Fire-fronted bishop, Euplectes diadematus
Black-winged bishop, Euplectes hordeaceus
Orange bishop, Euplectes franciscanus
Fan-tailed widowbird, Euplectes axillaris
Grosbeak weaver, Amblyospiza albifrons

Waxbills and allies
Order: PasseriformesFamily: Estrildidae

The estrildid finches are small passerine birds of the Old World tropics and Australasia. They are gregarious and often colonial seed eaters with short thick but pointed bills. They are all similar in structure and habits, but have wide variation in plumage colours and patterns.

Green-winged pytilia, Pytilia melba
Peters's twinspot, Hypargos niveoguttatus
Red-billed firefinch, Lagonosticta senegala
Black-faced firefinch, Lagonosticta larvata
Red-cheeked cordonbleu, Uraeginthus bengalus
Blue-capped cordonbleu, Uraeginthus cyanocephalus
Purple grenadier, Uraeginthus ianthinogaster
Crimson-rumped waxbill, Estrilda rhodopyga
Common waxbill, Estrilda astrild
Red-rumped waxbill, Estrilda charmosyna
African silverbill, Euodice cantans
Grey-headed silverbill, Odontospiza caniceps
Bronze mannikin, Spermestes cucullatus
Black-and-white mannikin, Spermestes bicolor
Cut-throat, Amadina fasciata

Indigobirds
Order: PasseriformesFamily: Viduidae

The indigobirds are finch-like species which usually have black or indigo predominating in their plumage. All are brood parasites, which lay their eggs in the nests of estrildid finches. There are 20 species worldwide and 5 species which occur in Somaliland.

Village indigobird, Vidua chalybeata
Steel-blue whydah, Vidua hypocherina
Straw-tailed whydah, Vidua fischeri
Pin-tailed whydah, Vidua macroura
Eastern paradise-whydah, Vidua paradisaea

Old World buntings
Order: PasseriformesFamily: Emberizidae

The emberizids are a large family of passerine birds. They are seed-eating birds with distinctively shaped bills. Many emberizid species have distinctive head patterns.

Ortolan bunting, Emberiza hortulana
Striolated bunting, Emberiza striolata
Cinnamon-breasted bunting, Emberiza tahapisi
Somali bunting, Emberiza poliopleura

Finches, euphonias, and allies
Order: PasseriformesFamily: Fringillidae

Finches are seed-eating passerine birds, that are small to moderately large and have a strong beak, usually conical and in some species very large. All have twelve tail feathers and nine primaries. These birds have a bouncing flight with alternating bouts of flapping and gliding on closed wings, and most sing well.

Somali golden-winged grosbeak, Rhynchostruthus louisae (E)
Warsangli linnet, Linaria johannis (E)
Black-throated canary, Crithagra atrogularis
Reichenow's seedeater, Crithagra reichenowi
Yellow-fronted canary, Crithagra mozambicus
Northern grosbeak-canary, Crithagra donaldsoni
White-bellied canary, Crithagra dorsostriatus
Brown-rumped seedeater, Crithagra tristriatus

Old World sparrows
Order: PasseriformesFamily: Passeridae

Old World sparrows are small passerine birds. In general, sparrows tend to be small, plump, brown or grey birds with short tails and short powerful beaks. Sparrows are seed eaters, but they also consume small insects. 

House sparrow, Passer domesticus (I)
Somali sparrow, Passer castanopterus
Grey-headed sparrow, Passer griseus
Swainson's sparrow, Passer swainsonii
Parrot-billed sparrow, Passer gongonensis
Arabian golden-sparrow, Passer euchlorus
Chestnut sparrow, Passer eminibey
Yellow-spotted petronia, Gymnoris pyrgita

See also
List of birds
Lists of birds by region
Wildlife of Somaliland

References

Somaliland
Somaliland
Birds
Somaliland